Mark Alnutt is the current director of athletics for the University at Buffalo. He previously served as athletic director for Southeast Missouri State University, and as assistant athletic director for the University of Memphis and the University of Missouri. Alnutt attended college at the University of Missouri, where he was a three-year letterman on the Missouri Tigers football team, playing linebacker and tight end. Alnutt was named athletic director at the University at Buffalo on March 21, 2018. On May 27, 2021, Alnutt and the University at Buffalo signed a new five-year contract for him to remain as vice president and director of athletics through May 2026.

References

External links
 
 Buffalo profile

1973 births
Living people
American football linebackers
American football tight ends
Buffalo Bulls athletic directors
Missouri Tigers football players
Southeast Missouri State Redhawks athletic directors
University of Missouri staff
Sportspeople from Kansas City, Missouri
African-American college athletic directors in the United States
African-American players of American football
20th-century African-American sportspeople
21st-century African-American sportspeople